Palode Ravi (born 25 July 1949) is an Indian politician and is the DCC President of Thiruvananthapuram. He has served as the Deputy speaker and member of the Kerala Legislative Assembly, from the Nedumangad constituency, representing the Indian National Congress.

Career
Ravi entered politics through Kerala Students Union. In his political career he served with many reputed posts such as General Secretary of Kerala Students Union District Committee, President, Kerala Students Union, District Committee, Youth Congress, District Committee and Indian National Trade Union Congress, General Secretary of  Indo-Russian Friendship Society, Kerala, Trivandrum District Congress Committee, Member of Executive Committee, Rubber Board, Plantation Labour Committee, Handloom Development Corporation President, Sree Chithira Thirunal Smaraka Samithi,  General Secretary of P.N. Panickar Foundation and  Member of Governing Body of State & National Literacy Mission, Executive Committee of Rajaram Mohan Roy Library Foundation, Grandhasala Sangham, Vyloppilli Samskriti Bhavan, Sahithya Academy.

At present he is serving as Member of Executive Committees of All India Congress Committee, Kerala Pradesh Congress Committee, All India Secretary of Indian National Trade Union Congress, chairman, ‘Samskara Sahithi’ – the arts and cultural forum of Kerala Pradesh Congress Committee and Office bearer of many trade unions.

References

1949 births
Living people
Members of the Kerala Legislative Assembly
Indian National Congress politicians from Kerala
People from Thiruvananthapuram district